Cedrick Wilson Jr. (born November 20, 1995) is an American football wide receiver for the Miami Dolphins of the National Football League (NFL). He played college football at Boise State.

Early years
Wilson attended White Station High School, in Memphis, Tennessee.  While there, he played quarterback for the football team. As a senior, he was named the starter, registering 731 passing yards, seven passing touchdowns, 268 rushing yards, two rushing touchdowns and five interceptions. He led his team to the Class 6A semifinals, while earning 6A All-State and second-team 16-AAA All-District honors.

College career
He attended Coffeyville Community College. As a freshman, he registered 629 yards and 10 touchdowns, receiving All-conference honors. As a sophomore, he posted 66 receptions, 1,045 receiving yards (second-highest in school history) and 17 touchdowns (fourth in the nation), while earning Junior College All-American honors.

In 2016, he transferred to Boise State University. As a junior, he appeared in 12 games, of which he started five. He recorded 56 receptions (second on the team) for 1,129 yards (second on the team) and 11 touchdowns (led the team). He returned 13 punts for 132 yards (13.2-yard average), with a long of 73 yards against UNLV and 13 kickoffs for 277 yards (21.3-yard average). He threw a 61-yard touchdown pass against Utah State. He played most of the season with torn ligaments in his left ankle, which he injured in the fifth game of the season against New Mexico.

As a senior, he started 13 games, posting 83 receptions (led the team) for 1,511 yards (led the team) and seven touchdowns (second on the team). He returned 18	kickoffs for 465 yards (25.8-yard average). Against Virginia, he set single-game career-highs in receptions (13) and receiving yards (209), while also scoring a touchdown. During the season he played through an ankle injury, including in the 38–28 win over Oregon at the Las Vegas Bowl, where he made 10 receptions for 221 yards and one touchdown whilst earning MVP honors.

College statistics

Professional career

Dallas Cowboys
Wilson was selected by the Dallas Cowboys in the sixth round (208th overall) of the 2018 NFL Draft. On July 31, Wilson was placed on injured reserve after being diagnosed with a torn labrum in his shoulder.

On August 31, 2019, Wilson was released after being passed on the depth chart by Devin Smith. He was signed to the practice squad on September 2. He was promoted to the active roster on September 13, to serve as the No. 5 receiver after fellow receiver Tavon Austin was ruled out for Week 2 after suffering a concussion in the season opener. He was placed on injured reserve with a knee injury on December 10. He appeared in six games and was declared inactive in six contests, posting five receptions for 46 yards. He played a role as both the kickoff and punt returner.

In 2020, Cedrick appeared in 16 games, while posting 17 receptions for 189 yards, two receiving touchdowns, two passes for 23 yards and one touchdown pass. In the Week 3, 31-38 loss against the Seattle Seahawks, Wilson finished with five receptions for 107 receiving yards and two touchdowns, as the team was forced to play more four wide receiver sets. It was the first game in his professional career with at least 100 receiving yards in a single game. In Week 5 against the New York Giants, Wilson threw an 11-yard touchdown pass to quarterback Dak Prescott on a trick play during the 37–34 win.

The Cowboys placed an original round restricted free agent tender on Wilson on March 17, 2021. He signed the one-year contract on April 22. 2021 saw Wilson more involved with the offense as a primary deep-ball threat due to teammate Michael Gallup missing half of the season because of injuries. In Week 8 against the Minnesota Vikings Wilson caught a 73-yard touchdown reception as the Cowboys would win the game 20-16. In Week 12 he had 104 yards on 7 receptions against the Las Vegas Raiders. Week 18 saw Wilson have his best game in his career against the Philadelphia Eagles, as he had 5 receptions for 119 yards and two touchdowns. Wilson finished the season with career highs in every statistical category; 602 yards and 6 touchdowns on 45 receptions.

Miami Dolphins
On March 17, 2022, Wilson signed a three-year, $22.8 million contract with the Miami Dolphins.

Personal life
His father Cedrick Wilson Sr., was a wide receiver in the NFL for seven years with the San Francisco 49ers and the Pittsburgh Steelers.

References

External links
Dallas Cowboys bio
Boise State Broncos bio

1995 births
Living people
Players of American football from Memphis, Tennessee
American football wide receivers
Coffeyville Red Ravens football players
Boise State Broncos football players
Dallas Cowboys players
Miami Dolphins players